The Cathay Financial Center is a 26-story,  skyscraper office building designed by Japanese architect Tokutoshi Torii and completed in 2002 in Xinyi District, Taipei, Taiwan. The building houses the corporate headquarters of Cathay Financial Holding. 

In 2017, Cathay Financial Center was awarded the Leadership in Energy and Environmental Design (LEED) EBOM Gold Certification for Green Buildings. It is the first environmentally-friendly building in the existing buildings category for the life insurance industry in Taiwan.

See also 
 List of tallest buildings in Taiwan
 List of tallest buildings in Taipei
 Xinyi Special District
 Farglory International Center
 Cathay Landmark

References

2002 establishments in Taiwan
Buildings and structures in Taipei
Skyscraper office buildings in Taipei
Office buildings completed in 2002